Margaret Josephine Hoelzer (born March 30, 1983) is an American former competition swimmer, Olympic medalist, and former world record-holder.  Hoelzer competed in the 2004 Summer Olympics and the 2008 Olympic Games.

Biography
While in Huntsville, Hoelzer swam in the summer for Jones Valley Recreation Association, and swam for her high school, Huntsville High School. She also coached for JVRA.

Hoelzer swam for the Auburn Tigers swimming and diving team while attending Auburn University, where she earned her degree in psychology with a minor in criminology.  In 2007, Hoelzer moved to Charlotte, NC to train with Coach David Marsh. In 2008, Hoelzer relocated to Seattle, Washington and then to Fullerton, California with coach Sean Hutchison to train at Fullerton Aquatics.

Her grandfather, Helmut Hoelzer invented the first fully electronic analog computer and was a member of the Wernher von Braun Operation Paperclip team. Her sister, Martha Hoelzer ran cross country and track for the University of Alabama and University of North Carolina at Chapel Hill.

Swimming career

2003 World Aquatics Championships

2004 Olympics

At the 2004 U.S. Olympic Trials, Hoelzer qualified to swim the 200-meter backstroke by placing first, with a time of 2:11.88. She also swam in the 100-meter backstroke, but did not qualify to swim that event at the Olympics.

In the 2004 Summer Olympics in Athens, Greece, she placed 5th in the 200-meter backstroke, with a time of 2:10.70.

2005 World Aquatics Championships

2007 World Aquatics Championships

2008 Olympics

At the U.S. Trials on July 1, 2008, Hoelzer qualified to swim in the 100-meter backstroke at the 2008 Olympics. On July 5, 2008, Hoelzer broke her former Auburn University roommate Kirsty Coventry's world record of 2:06.39 in the 200-meter backstroke with a time of 2:06.09, ultimately qualifying for her second event in the 2008 Olympics. This record was broken in Beijing by Coventry. She also qualified for the women's 4×100-meter medley relay.

Hoelzer won a bronze medal in the 100-meter backstroke on August 12 in Beijing. She also won the silver medal in the 200-meter backstroke on August 16, and the silver medal in the 4×100-meter medley relay on August 17 after swimming in the qualifying heats for that event.

Personal life
Hoelzer has revealed that she was sexually abused as a child.  She said she shared her story to prevent future incidents of sexual abuse.  Hoelzer is the national spokesperson for the National Children's Advocacy Center, and has received the "Voice of Courage" award from the Darkness to Light organization.

See also

 List of Auburn University people
 List of Olympic medalists in swimming (women)
 List of World Aquatics Championships medalists in swimming (women)
 World record progression 200 metres backstroke
 World record progression 4 × 100 metres medley relay

References

External links
 
 
 
 
 
 
 
 Official website

1983 births
Living people
American female backstroke swimmers
American female freestyle swimmers
Auburn Tigers women's swimmers
World record setters in swimming
Olympic bronze medalists for the United States in swimming
Olympic silver medalists for the United States in swimming
Sportspeople from Huntsville, Alabama
Swimmers at the 2008 Summer Olympics
World Aquatics Championships medalists in swimming
Medalists at the FINA World Swimming Championships (25 m)
Medalists at the 2008 Summer Olympics
20th-century American women
21st-century American women